King Eric or King Erik may refer to:

Actual kings
Eric I of Denmark
Eric II of Denmark
Eric III of Denmark
Eric IV of Denmark
Eric V of Denmark
Eric VI of Denmark
Eric Christoffersen of Denmark
Eric Bloodaxe
Eric II of Norway
Eric the Victorious
Eric and Eric
Eric IX of Sweden
Eric XI of Sweden
Eric XII of Sweden
Eric XIV of Sweden
Eric of Pomerania

Legendary kings
Erik Björnsson
Erik Refilsson
Eric Anundsson
Eric son of Ring
Erik Årsäll
Eric Weatherhat
Alaric and Eric

Others nicknamed "King Eric"
 Eric Cantona, French actor and former footballer for Manchester United and the France national football team
 Eric Gibson, Bahamian musician and entrepreneur
 Eric Abidal, French footballer

See also
Eirik of Hordaland
Eohric of East Anglia
Erik, brother of Jorund, a Swedish king of the House of Yngling
 Eric